The HSC Santa Irini  is one of four high speed monohull ferries built by Fincantieri for Sea Containers. She is currently owned and operated by Horizon Sea Lines.

The vessel was delivered in May 1997 as Superseacat One and put into service on the Gothenburg - Frederikshavn route.  In 1999 Seacat Danmark returned to the Gothenburg - Frederikshavn route allowing Superseacat One to move to the English Channel to open a new Hoverspeed route between Newhaven and Dieppe.  After four years of operation, Hoverspeed closed the Newhaven - Dieppe route in 2004.  Superseacat One was laid up in Sunderland.  In 2005 she returned to Scandinavia, this time joining Superseacat Three and Superseacat Four on Silja Line's Helsinki - Tallinn route.  Following the sale of Silja Line to Tallink in 2006, Superseacat One was chartered to Acciona Trasmediterránea and renamed Almudaina Dos.  The vessel operates between Las Palmas de Gran Canaria and Santa Cruz De Tenerife.

In 2022, the vessel was sold to Greek ferry company Horizon Sea lines and was renamed Santa Irini. Since August 1, 2022 she sails daily between Heraklion and Santorini.

References

Ferries of Spain
Ships built in Italy
MDV 1200-class fast ferries
1997 ships
Ships built by Fincantieri